KFF Skënderbeu Korçë is the women's team of KF Skënderbeu Korçë.

Current squad

 

 (Captain)

References

External links
 Official Website 
 Albanian Football Association Official Website 
 KF Skënderbeu at UEFA.com 

KF Skënderbeu Korçë
Football clubs in Albania
Association football clubs established in 1909
Association football clubs established in 2015
Women's football clubs in Albania
Korçë